Iku (stylized as IKU) is a Japanese singer who was signed to NBCUniversal Entertainment Japan. She debuted in 2008 with the single , produced by the music production group I've Sound. She worked with them only as a guest vocalist initially and the partnership lasted until 2009, when her first album came out, however, in 2014, she officially joined the group.

Discography

Albums

Singles

Live performances
I've in Budokan 2009: Departed to the future (January 2, 2009)
Dengeki Geneon Music festival (September 26, 2010)
Geneon FripSide festival 2010 (December 5, 2010)
DK anime complex festival 2011 (January 23, 2011)

References

External links
  
 Official blog 
 Official Twitter account 

Anime musicians
Japanese women pop singers
I've Sound members
NBCUniversal Entertainment Japan artists
Musicians from Sapporo
21st-century Japanese singers
21st-century Japanese women singers
Trance singers